BTU is an acronym referring to the British thermal unit

BTU may also refer to:
 Bathurst Trade Union, the first trade union organization in Bathurst in The Gambia
 Benzylthiouracil, a pharmaceutical compound
 Board of Trade unit, an obsolete British term for the kilowatt hour
 "BT-U", a track on the John Abercrombie album, Speak of the Devil (John Abercrombie album)
 Peabody Energy Corporation, NYSE ticker symbol BTU
 IATA code for Bintulu Airport
 Brandenburg University of Technology, Brandenburgische Technische Universität, a technical school in Cottbus, Germany
 BTU, a collaborative music group with solo musicians  Barney Bentall, Tom Taylor, and Shari Ulrich